Waseda University, abbreviated as  Sōdai (早大) , is a private research university in Shinjuku, Tokyo. Founded in 1882 as the Tōkyō Senmon Gakkō by Ōkuma Shigenobu, the school was formally renamed Waseda University in 1902.

The university has numerous notable alumni, including 9 prime ministers of Japan, a number of important figures of Japanese literature, including Haruki Murakami, and many CEOs, including Tadashi Yanai, the CEO of UNIQLO, Nobuyuki Idei, the former CEO of Sony, Takeo Fukui, the former president and CEO of Honda, Norio Sasaki, the former CEO of Toshiba, Lee Kun-hee, the chairman of Samsung Group, Mikio Sasaki, the former chairman of Mitsubishi, and Hiroshi Yamauchi and Shuntaro Furukawa, former and current presidents of Nintendo respectively. Waseda was ranked 26th and 48th globally in the QS Graduate Employability Rankings 2017 and Times Higher Education Alma Mater Index 2017, respectively.

Waseda is regarded as one of the most selective and prestigious universities in Japanese university rankings, particularly for its humanities and social sciences education. It is often ranked alongside Keio University, its rival, as the best private university in Japan. In 2020–2021, Waseda University ranked 189th in the QS World University Rankings. Waseda is selected as one of the “Top Type” (Type A) universities under MEXT's Top Global University Project. The university is also a member of RU11 and APRU.

Waseda is organized into thirty-six departments: thirteen undergraduate schools and twenty-three graduate schools. As of May 2016, there were 42,860 undergraduate students and 8,269 graduate students. In addition to a central campus in Shinjuku, the university operates campuses in Chūō, Nishitōkyō, Tokorozawa, Honjō, and Kitakyūshū. Waseda also operates twenty-one research institutes at its main Shinjuku campus. The Waseda University Library is collectively one of Japan's largest libraries and currently hold some 4.5 million volumes and 46,000 serials.

History

It was renamed  on 2 September 1902, upon acquiring university status. It started as a college with three departments under the old Japanese system of higher education.

In 1882, the university had the department of political science and economics, law, and physical science. Along with these departments, an English language course was established, where the students of all the departments could learn English. Three years later, the department of physical science was closed because it had too few applicants.

The department of literature was established in 1890, the department of education in 1903, the department of commerce in 1904, and the department of science and engineering in 1908.

Although Waseda formally adopted the term university in its title in 1902 it was not until 1920 that, in common with other Japanese schools and colleges, it received formal government recognition as a university under the terms of the University Establishment Ordinance. Thus Waseda became, with Keio University, the first private university in Japan.

Much of the campus was destroyed in the fire bombings of Tokyo during World War II, but the university was rebuilt and reopened by 1949. It has grown to become a comprehensive university with two senior high schools and school of art and architecture.

On 12 June 1950, sixty police raided Waseda University and seized copies of a Communist-inspired open letter to General MacArthur. The open letter to MacArthur was once read at a Communist-sponsored rally a week earlier. The letter demanded a peace treaty for Japan that would include Russia and Communist China, withdrawal of occupation forces, and the release of eight Japanese sent to prison for assaulting five U.S. soldiers at a Communist rally. A police official said most Waseda meetings would be banned in the future because "political elements" might try to utilize them. Yuichi Eshima, Vice-chairman of the Students Autonomy Society, said the police action "stupefied" students and professors, and that "This is worse than the prewar peace preservation measures."

Academic cap
Ōkuma had long desired to create an academic cap so distinctive that someone wearing the cap would immediately be identified as a Waseda student. The chief tailor of Takashimaya, Yashichiro, was called upon to design a cap in three days.
Each square cap was stamped on the inside with the student's name, his department, the school seal and the legend, "This certifies that the owner is a student of Waseda". Thus, the cap served as a form of identification, and effectively a status symbol. The cap, with its gold-braided badge, is registered as a trademark.

125th anniversary

On 21 October 2007, Waseda University celebrated its 125th anniversary. Ōkuma often talked about the "125 years of life" theory: "The lifespan of a human being can be as long as 125 years. He will be able to live out his natural lifespan as long as he takes proper care of his health", because "physiologists say that every animal has the ability to live five times as long as its growth period. Since a man is said to require about 25 years to become fully mature, it follows that he can live up to 125 years of age." This theory propounded by Ōkuma was very popular and often referred to in the media of the time.

In commemorative events relating to Waseda University and Ōkuma, the number 125 is accorded special significance, as it marks an important epoch. The tower of Ōkuma Auditorium, completed on the university's 45th anniversary, is 125 shaku, or about 38 m high. In 1963, there were also events to mark the 125th anniversary of Ōkuma Shigenobu's birth.

Ōkuma, who twice served as prime minister of Japan, organized his second cabinet when he was 77 and died when he was 83. He said, "I wish I had understood this '125 years of life' theory 30 years earlier". He did, however, lead a regular life, and lived fairly long compared to other Japanese at the time.

Campus
 Campus  Station

Waseda University's main campus is located in the Nishi-Waseda district of Shinjuku.

Apart from the main campus in Shinjuku, there are other campuses around the country:
 Waseda (Main) Campus: Shinjuku, Tokyo (formerly known as the Nishi-Waseda Campus)
 Toyama Campus: Shinjuku, Tokyo
 Nishi-Waseda Campus: Shinjuku, Tokyo (formerly known as the Ōkubo Campus)
 Nihonbashi Campus: Chūō-ku, Tokyo
 Higashifushimi Campus: Nishitōkyō, Tokyo
 Tokorozawa Campus: Tokorozawa, Saitama
 Honjō Campus: Honjō, Saitama
 Kitakyūshū Campus: Kitakyūshū, Fukuoka

Organization

Undergraduate programs
Waseda's undergraduate schools have a total entrance capacity of 8,800 students. Individual entrance capacities are denoted below.

 School of Political Science and Economics – 900
 School of Law – 740
 School of Culture, Media and Society – 860
 School of Humanities and Social Sciences – 660
 School of Education – 960
 School of Commerce – 900
 School of Fundamental Science and Engineering – 535
 School of Creative Science and Engineering – 595
 School of Advanced Science and Engineering – 540
 School of Social Sciences – 630
 School of Human Sciences – 560
 School of Sports Sciences – 400
 School of International Liberal Studies – 600

Graduate programs

 Graduate School of Political Science
 Graduate School of Economics
 Graduate School of Law
 Graduate School of Letters, Arts and Sciences
 Graduate School of Commerce
 Graduate School of Fundamental Science and Engineering
 Graduate School of Creative Science and Engineering
 Graduate School of Advanced Science and Engineering
 Graduate School of Education
 Graduate School of Human Sciences
 Graduate School of Social Sciences
 Graduate School of Asia-Pacific Studies
 Graduate School of Global Information and Telecommunication Studies
 Graduate School of Japanese Applied Linguistics
 Graduate School of Information, Production and Systems
 Graduate School of Sports Sciences
 Business School
 The Okuma School of Public Management
 Law School
 Graduate School of Finance, Accounting and Law
 Graduate School of Accountancy
 Graduate School of Environment and Energy Engineering
 Graduate School of Journalism

Research institutes

 Kagami Memorial Laboratory for Materials Science and Technology
 Institute for Comparative Law
 The Institute for Research in Business Administration
 Institute for Research in Contemporary Political and Economic Affairs
 Advanced Research Center for Human Sciences
 Advanced Research Institute for Science and Engineering
 Institute of Asia-Pacific Studies
 Global Information and Telecommunication Institute
 Institute for Advanced Studies in Education
 Center for Japanese Language
 Media Network Center
 Environmental Research Institute
 Environmental Safety Center
 Center for Finance Research
 Human Service Center
 Comprehensive Research Organization (Project Research Institute)
 Institute for Nanoscience & Nanotechnology
 Consolidated Research Institute for Advanced Science and Medical Care
 Information Technology Research Organization
 Organization for Asian Studies
 Waseda Institute for Advanced Study (WIAS)

Facilities

Ōkuma Auditorium

The Ōkuma Auditorium is three-story main auditorium that seats 1,435, while the secondary auditorium, located underground, can accommodate 382 people. A seven-story high clock tower stands to the left of the auditorium. Important events and lectures hosted by Waseda University are often held in the Ōkuma Auditorium. Club-sponsored plays, lectures and events are held in the auditorium on days when it is not in use by the university. Many of Waseda University's undergraduate and graduate schools hold their entrance and graduation ceremonies at the Okuma Auditorium.

The auditorium opened on 20 October 1927, about five years behind schedule, after the 1923 Great Kantō earthquake. A Memorial Hall, constructed in 1957, was used as the fencing venue for the 1964 Summer Olympics.

In April 1999, the auditorium along with the old library building were officially designated the first and second historical buildings under the newly passed Tokyo Metropolitan Landscape Regulations, which aim to preserve buildings representative of Tokyo's history and culture. The auditorium was designated as one of the Important Cultural Properties of Japan by the Agency for Cultural Affairs in 2007.

Ōkuma Garden

Ōkuma Garden is located near Ōkuma Auditorium. It is a half-Japanese, half-Western garden of Edo period feudal lord Matsudaira Sanuki's former mansion, redesigned by Shigenobu Ōkuma. After his death, the garden was donated to Waseda University. Now it is a recreation place for students.

Libraries and museums
The Waseda University Library, designed by Tachu Naitō, Kenji Imai and Kin'ichi Kiriyama, was completed in 1925. The reading room was housed in a separate two-story building, with a seating capacity of 500. One of the prominent libraries established at the end of the Taishō period, it has been a symbol of Waseda University to this day, along with the Okuma Auditorium and the Theatre Museum.

The Old Library and the administration building were expanded in 1934 and 1955, respectively. After the New Central Library, the Old Library stopped serving as a main library, located where the Abe Stadium used to be, was completed in 1990. It now houses Takata Sanae Memorial Research Library, the University Archives, and Aizu Yaichi Museum. Takata Sanae Memorial Research Library opened in 1994. It is named after former university president Takata Sanae. Historical and cultural materials on Waseda University are exhibited in the University Archives, and the materials related with Ōkuma Shigenobu are exhibited in the Ōkuma Memorial Room at the Archives. Aizu Yaichi Memorial Museum opened in 1998.

In the front hall, visitors are greeted by the masterpiece "Meian", which dates back to 1927. It is painted on the world's largest hand-made washi (Japanese paper), which is 4.45 meters in diameter and weighs about 12 kilograms. It was manufactured by Iwano　Heisaburō, the founder of the Echizen paper works in Imadachi-cho, Fukui prefecture. The masterpiece was painted free of charge by Yokoyama Taikan and Shimomura Kanzan, two artists who represented the modern Japanese style of painting. President Takata Sanae asked them to paint a picture for the Library.

The library possesses a unique collection which survived the Bombing of Tokyo in World War II unlike many of its counterparts. The collection is an important resource for the study of pre-war Japanese history and literature.

Other museums and libraries on Waseda campuses include:
 Waseda University Library
 Waseda University Tsubouchi Memorial Theatre Museum
 Aizu Museum

Athletics

American football

Cheerleading
The Waseda University Cheerleading Club  is the cheerleading club of Waseda University.

Baseball

Waseda's baseball team is known for their long history of success in Tokyo Big6 Baseball League. As of the end of the 2012 season, Waseda had won 43 championships along with the highest winning percentage.

They are also known for their rivalry with Keiō University, highlighted by the Sōkeisen series. The series is held twice a year in the spring and autumn at Meiji-Jingu Stadium, considered one of the most important matches of the year for students from both schools.

Football
Waseda University football team won the Emperor's Cup, in 1964 and 1967.

Rugby union
Waseda University Rugby Football Club has reached the final of the All-Japan University Rugby Championship 31 times, and winning fifteen times, most recently in 2008. Its two traditional rivals are Keio University and Meiji University.
 University championship rugby

Karate
The Waseda University karate club is one of the oldest in Japan, formed in 1931 under the direction of Gichin Funakoshi.  Graduates of the karate club include Shigeru Egami, leader of the Shotokai school, Kazumi Tabata, founder of the North American Karate-do Federation and Tsutomu Ohshima, founder of Shotokan Karate of America.

Fencing 
 
Waseda's fencing club was established in 1946. In recent years it has achieved impressive intercollegiate and national results. In 2021, Waseda won the men's Epee team division. In 2022, Waseda further strengthened their achievements, claiming victory in all weapon types (Foil, Sabre, Epee) for both men and women's division.

Bandy
In 2016, the first university bandy team in Japan was founded. With no field of regular size, they play rink bandy.

Academic rankings

Waseda University is considered one of the most selective and prestigious universities in Japan. The university seeks to promote student and faculty exchange as well as collaborative research through memorandums of agreement signed with 432 partnership institutions in 79 countries. Waseda University has the highest entrance examination difficulty level among private universities in Japan, along with Keio University.

General rankings
The university ranked 2nd in 2015–2016 in Toyo Keizai's  ranking. In another ranking, Japanese prep school Kawaijuku ranked Waseda as the 13th best university in Japan.

According to the Times Higher Education World University Rankings 2016–2017, Waseda University ranked 601–800th worldwide and 121-130th in Asia.

In addition, according to the QS World university rankings in 2016–2017, Waseda University was ranked 201st in the world and 41st in Asia. Waseda Business School and Waseda Graduate School of Economics obtained the highest rank – five PALMS – in a Universal Business Ranking in 2013.

In 2014, The Center for World University Rankings ranked Waseda University 40th (world). Waseda University was also ranked 20th in the world in the Times Higher Education Alma Mater Index: Global Executives 2013 top 100.

Research performance
Generally speaking, national universities in Japan have better research standards; however, Waseda is one of the few private universities which compete with top national universities. According to Weekly Diamond, Waseda has the 12th highest research standard in Japan in terms of research fundings per researchers in COE Program, and it is one of only two private universities within the top 15.

On 16 February 2004, Nikkei Shimbun ran a survey about research standards in engineering studies based on Thomson Reuters, Grants in Aid for Scientific Research and questionnaires to heads of 93 leading Japanese Research Centers. Waseda ranked 5th overall, 7th in research planning, and 1st in business-academia collaboration. Waseda was the only private university ranked in the top 5.

Asahi Shimbun summarized the number of academic papers in Japanese major legal journals by university, and Waseda was ranked 3rd during 2005–2009.

Graduate school rankings
According to the Asia Top MBA Business Schools Ranking by Asiaweek, Waseda Business School is ranked 2nd in Japan. Eduniversal also ranked Japanese business schools and Waseda is 2nd in Japan (93rd in the world). In this ranking, Waseda is one of only 3 Japanese business schools categorized in "Universal Business schools with major international influence".

Waseda Law School is considered one of the top Japanese law schools, as Waseda's successful candidates for bar examination was 5th in 2009 and 2010 in Japan.

Alumni rankings
According to the Weekly Diamond on 18 February 2006, Waseda got the highest score from the directors of human resource departments in Greater Tokyo in its . Waseda was ranked 1st in Social Science and 2nd in Natural Science and Engineering among all Japanese universities. According to the Weekly Economist's 2010 rankings and the PRESIDENT's article on 16 October 2006, graduates from Waseda have the 11th best employment rate in 400 major companies, and the alumni average salary is the 7th best in Japan.

Mines ParisTech : Professional Ranking World Universities ranked Waseda University as 4th in the world in 2010 (8th in 2011) in terms of the number of alumni listed among CEOs in the 500 largest worldwide companies. The university is also ranked 2nd in Japan for the number of alumni holding the position of executive in the listed companies of Japan.

The number of lawyers who graduated Waseda has been ranked 3rd in Japan since 1949. Furthermore, Waseda alumni have been the 2nd largest group in the Japanese Parliament.

Popularity and selectivity
Waseda is one of the most selective and sought after universities in Japan. The number of applicants per place was 20.5 (115515/5630) in the 2011 undergraduate admissions. This number of applicants was 2nd largest in Japan. its entrance difficulty is usually considered top with Keio among 730 private universities.

Nikkei BP has been publishing a ranking system called "Brand rankings of Japanese universities" every year, composed by the various indications related to the power of brand, and Waseda was top in 2010 and 3rd in 2009 in Greater Tokyo Area.

Evaluation from Business World

Alumni

There are currently more than 600,000 alumni members. Among the notable alumni of Waseda University have become leading politicians, businessmen, writers, architects, athletes, actors, musicians, scientists, and those that have gained both national and international fame. To develop alumni connections, the Waseda network consists of over 50 alumni groups, or "Tomonkai," on six continents. Among notable alumni are Masaru Ibuka, co-founder of Sony; Shuntaro Furukawa, president of Nintendo; world-renowned novelist Haruki Murakami; Prime Ministers of Japan Tanzan Ishibashi, Noboru Takeshita, Toshiki Kaifu, Keizō Obuchi, Yoshirō Mori, Yasuo Fukuda, Yoshihiko Noda and Fumio Kishida; pioneering video artist and experimental filmmaker Kohei Ando; Li Dazhao, co-founder of the Communist Party of China; Palme d'Or winning director Shohei Imamura; Tadashi Yanai, founder and CEO of Fast Retailing and the richest man in Japan; Chiune Sugihara, Japanese diplomat who rescued 5,558 Jews during the Holocaust; Shizuka Arakawa, 2006 Olympic Champion figure skater; famed tanka poet Hakushū Kitahara; Doppo Kunikida, Meiji-era novelist and poet noted as one of the inventors of Japanese naturalism; former mayor of Osaka city Tōru Hashimoto; accomplished Major League Baseball player Nori Aoki; and 2014, 2018 two-time Olympic Champion figure skater Yuzuru Hanyu.

Faculty and presidents

Faculty
Professors who are also Waseda alumni are listed in italics.

 Yaichi Aizu, poet, scholar of ancient Chinese and Japanese art, and namesake of Aizu Museum
 Tameyuki Amano, economics scholar and educator
Kohei Ando, Professor Emeritus of Cinema
 Yasunobu Fujiwara, scholar of political science
 Lafcadio Hearn, novelist, literary scholar, professor of English literature
 Smimasa Idditti (Sumimasa Idichi ), professor of English
 Kenji Imai, architect
 Tokio Kimura, historian
 Kunitake Kume, historian
 Tachu Naito, architect
 Naoyoshi Nakamura, historian
 Haruo Nishihara, law professor, former president
 Takayasu Okushima, law professor, former president
 Hajime Ōnishi, philosopher
 Ikuo Ōyama, scholar of political science
 Yaso Saijo, poet
 Masasada Shiozawa, scholar of economics, former president
 Sanae Takata, scholar of political science, former president
 Ōdō Tanaka, philosopher
 Shoyo Tsubouchi, playwright, critic, translator, educator, professor of English literature, and namesake of Tsubouchi Memorial Theater Museum
 Sokichi Tsuda, historian, recipient of the Order of Culture
 Kazutami Ukita, scholar of political science
 Shujiro Urata, economist
 Yoshio Yamanouchi, translator, scholar of French literature
 Akira Yonekura, law professor
 Takamasa Yoshizaka, architect
 Shigeaki Sugeta, linguist

Principals, de facto presidents (1907–1923), and presidents

Principals
 Hidemaro Ōkuma, 1882–1886
 Hisoka Maejima, 1886–1890
 Kazuo Hatoyama, 1890–1907

De facto presidents (1907–1923)
 Sanae Takata, 1907–1915
 Tameyuki Amano, 1915–1917
 Yoshiro Hiranuma, 1918–1921
 Masasada Shiozawa, 1921–1923

Presidents
 Shigenobu Ōkuma, 1907–1922
 Masasada Shiozawa, 1923
 Sanae Takata, 1923–1931
 Hozumi Tanaka (public finance scholar, Doctor of Laws, 1876–1944), 1931–1944
 Tomio Nakano, 1944–1946
 Koichi Shimada, 1946–1954
 Nobumoto Ōhama, 1954–1966
 Kenichi Abe, 1966–1968
 Tsunesaburo Tokikoyama, 1968–1970
 Sukenaga Murai, 1970–1978
 Tsukasa Shimizu, 1978–1982
 Haruo Nishihara, 1982–1990
 Chūmaru Koyama, 1990–1994
 Takayasu Okushima, 1994–2002
 Katsuhiko Shirai, 2002–2010
 Kaoru Kamata, 2010–2018
 Aiji Tanaka, 2018–present

Trustees
 Ryuhoku Narushima, poet, journalist, and one of the first trustees of Waseda
 Azusa Ono (1852–1886), law scholar and one of the first trustees of Waseda

Benefactors
Waseda University has had numerous benefactors, including:
 Eiichi Shibusawa, businessman and philanthropist
 Ichizaemon Morimura, businessman
 Koichiro Kagami, businessman
 Kenkichi Kodera, presenter of over thirty-six thousand foreign books to the Library
 Kisaku Maekawa, businessman and philanthropist
 Masaru Ibuka, after whom Masaru Ibuka Auditorium (Hall) is named.
 Robert J. Shillman, founder & CEO of Cognex Corporation, the namesake of Robert Shillman Hall

See also
 List of National Treasures of Japan (writings)

Notes

References
 Kimura, Tokio. Waga Waseda: Ōkuma Shigenobu to sono kengaku seishin, Tokyo, Kobunsha, 1997. 
 Okushima, Takayasu.; and Nakamura, Naoyoshi., eds. Tōmonno gunzo, Tokyo, Waseda University Press, 1992.

Further reading
 ULTIMATE CRUSH: Waseda University Rugby, Leadership and Building the Strongest Winning Team in Japan by Katsuyuki Kiyomiya, translated into English by Ian Ruxton (September 2006). The original was published in February 2006 entitled Kyukyoku no Shori: Ultimate Crush .

External links

  
  
 

 
1882 establishments in Japan
Venues of the 1964 Summer Olympics
Educational institutions established in 1882
Super Global Universities
Olympic fencing venues
Olympic modern pentathlon venues
Private universities and colleges in Japan
American football in Japan
Kantoh Collegiate American Football Association Top 8 university
Universities and colleges in Tokyo